The Formula Renault 2.0 Sweden is a Formula Renault 2.0 championship held in Denmark, Finland and Sweden between 2002 and 2006, and later since 2009. It has served as a support series to the Danish Touring Car Championship and Swedish Touring Car Championship.

This championship was formerly named Formula Renault 2000 Scandinavia until 2005 and Formula Renault 2.0 Nordic Series in 2006.

The Formula Renault 2.0 Finland ran from 2008 until 2010.

Champions

Formula Renault 2.0 Finland

References

Sweden
Auto racing series in Sweden